Keith Urban (also known as Keith Urban II) is the second studio album by the Australian country music artist of the same name. It was released on 19 October 1999 via Capitol Nashville. It was nominated at the 2000 ARIA Music Awards for Best Country Album, but lost to Troy Cassar-Daley for Big River.

Before this album, Urban recorded a self-titled album in Australia in 1991 and another in the US as a member of the short-lived band The Ranch. The US album is Urban's breakthrough album, as it produced four singles on the Billboard Hot Country Songs chart. In order of release, the singles were "It's a Love Thing" (number 18), "Your Everything" (number 4), "But for the Grace of God" (number 1), and "Where the Blacktop Ends" (number 3). It has sold 980,000 copies in the U.S., according to Nielsen SoundScan.
The track "A Little Luck of Our Own" was originally titled "Luck of Our Own" as first recorded by American singer and songwriter Dale Daniel on her 1993 album of the same name. This is Urban's only album to not be produced by Dann Huff, who has produced all his albums since. While his contemporaries, Tim McGraw and Kenny Chesney, started with a neotraditional country sound, Urban had a crossover-friendly country pop sound from the very beginning.

Track listing

Personnel
 David Angell – violin
 Bruce Bouton – pedal steel guitar, pedabro
 John Catchings – cello
 Steve Conn – accordion
 Eric Darken – percussion
 David Davidson – violin
 Stuart Duncan – fiddle
 Tabitha Fair – background vocals
 Jerry Flowers – background vocals
 Paul Franklin – pedal steel guitar
 Aubrey Haynie – fiddle, mandolin
 Kim Keyes – background vocals
 Chris McHugh – drums, drum loops, percussion
 Emily Robison – background vocals
 Matt Rollings – organ, piano, synthesizer, background vocals
 Martie Seidel – background vocals
 Keith Urban – banjo, acoustic guitar, electric guitar, electric sitar, slide guitar, lead vocals, background vocals
 Steve Wariner – acoustic guitar, electric guitar, background vocals
 Biff Watson – acoustic guitar
 Kristin Wilkinson – programming, string arrangements, synthesizer programming, viola
 Glenn Worf – bass guitar
 Curtis Young – background vocals

Charts
Keith Urban debuted at number 145 on the US Billboard 200 and number 17 on the Top Country Albums. In December 2003, Keith Urban was certified Platinum by the RIAA.

Weekly charts

Year-end charts

Certifications

References

1999 albums
Keith Urban albums
Capitol Records albums
Albums produced by Matt Rollings